Mumbuluma Falls is a set of waterfalls just outside Mansa, Zambia in the Luapula Province.  The waterfalls are a national monument of Zambia.

Mumbuluma Falls is made up of two waterfalls occurring in succession, an upper and lower falls.

External links 
 Satellite view via Google Maps
 Photo gallery of Mumbuluma Falls

Waterfalls of Zambia
Geography of Luapula Province
Tourist attractions in Luapula Province